Kenechuhwu Uchenwa   (born 3 June 1991), commonly known as Uche, is a Nigerian footballer who plays for Spanish club CD Manchego Ciudad Real. Mainly a defensive midfielder, he can also play as a central defender.

Football career
Born in Enugu, Uche grew in the youth ranks of Spanish side RCD Mallorca, and made his senior debuts with the reserves in the 2010–11 season, in Segunda División B. On 19 January 2012 he damaged his anterior cruciate ligament, being sidelined for six months; in February he underwent surgery, only returning to the fields in October.

On 1 November Uche made his official debut with the first team, starting in a 1–1 away draw against Deportivo de La Coruña for the season's Copa del Rey. However, he was replaced in the 13th minute, after suffering another knee injury, being sidelined for further six months.

On 3 July 2013 Uche signed a new three-year deal with the Balearics, being also promoted to the first team. He continued to appear with the B-side, however, and rescinded his contract on 27 August 2015.

On 12 January 2017, Uche moved to fellow third-tier club CD Atlético Baleares.

References

External links

1991 births
Living people
Footballers from Enugu
Nigerian footballers
Association football defenders
Association football midfielders
Segunda División B players
Tercera División players
RCD Mallorca B players
RCD Mallorca players
UE Cornellà players
CD Atlético Baleares footballers
CF Badalona players
Arenas Club de Getxo footballers
CD Manchego Ciudad Real players
Nigerian expatriate footballers
Nigerian expatriate sportspeople in Spain
Expatriate footballers in Spain